Katrina Connor, known professionally as Kat Solar, is an American singer based in Detroit.

Career
Her debut studio album, Snake Eyes, was released in 2012.

In 2015, she released her second studio album, Infinity, along with the title track as the album's first single. A music video for the single was released on June 25, 2015, and was described by Digital Journal as "futuristic and whimsical".

Discography

As lead artist

References

American women pop singers
Musicians from Detroit